Josiah James Evans (November 27, 1786May 6, 1858) was a United States Senator from South Carolina from 1853 to 1858.

Evans was born in Marlborough district in South Carolina and lived most of his life there and in Darlington district, South Carolina. He was a lawyer and judge for many years before becoming a Senator. He died in Washington, D.C., shortly before his first term was to expire. He was a Democrat. During his time in the Senate he was chairman of the committees on auditing the contingency expenses of the Senate and Revolutionary Claims. He is buried near his ancestral home on Society Hill, Darlington County, South Carolina.

See also
List of United States Congress members who died in office (1790–1899)

References

External links 

1786 births
1858 deaths
South Carolina Democrats
Democratic Party United States senators from South Carolina
Burials in South Carolina
19th-century American politicians